This is a list of formulas encountered in Riemannian geometry. Einstein notation is used throughout this article. This article uses the "analyst's" sign convention for Laplacians, except when noted otherwhise.

Christoffel symbols, covariant derivative

In a smooth coordinate chart, the Christoffel symbols of the first kind are given by

and the Christoffel symbols of the second kind by

Here  is the inverse matrix to the metric tensor .  In other words,

and thus

is the dimension of the manifold.

Christoffel symbols satisfy the symmetry relations

 or, respectively,

the second of which is equivalent to the torsion-freeness of the Levi-Civita connection.

The contracting relations on the Christoffel symbols are given by

and

where |g| is the absolute value of the determinant of the metric tensor .  These are useful when dealing with divergences and Laplacians (see below).

The covariant derivative of a vector field with components  is given by:

and similarly the covariant derivative of a -tensor field with components  is given by:

For a -tensor field with components  this becomes

and likewise for tensors with more indices.

The covariant derivative of a function (scalar)  is just its usual differential:

Because the Levi-Civita connection is metric-compatible, the covariant derivatives of metrics vanish,

as well as the covariant derivatives of the metric's determinant (and volume element)

The geodesic  starting at the origin with initial speed  has Taylor expansion in the chart:

Curvature tensors

Definitions

(3,1) Riemann curvature tensor

(3,1) Riemann curvature tensor

Ricci curvature

Scalar curvature

Traceless Ricci tensor

(4,0) Riemann curvature tensor

(4,0) Weyl tensor

Einstein tensor

Identities

Basic symmetries
 
 
The Weyl tensor has the same basic symmetries as the Riemann tensor, but its 'analogue' of the Ricci tensor is zero:
 
 
The Ricci tensor, the Einstein tensor, and the traceless Ricci tensor are symmetric 2-tensors:

First Bianchi identity

Second Bianchi identity

Contracted second Bianchi identity

Twice-contracted second Bianchi identity 
 

Equivalently:

Ricci identity 
If  is a vector field then
 
which is just the definition of the Riemann tensor. If  is a one-form then
 
More generally, if  is a (0,k)-tensor field then

Remarks
A classical result says that  if and only if  is locally conformally flat, i.e. if and only if  can be covered by smooth coordinate charts relative to which the metric tensor is of the form  for some function  on the chart.

Gradient, divergence, Laplace–Beltrami operator

The gradient of a function  is obtained by raising the index of the differential , whose components are given by:

The divergence of a vector field with components  is
 

The Laplace–Beltrami operator acting on a function  is given by the divergence of the gradient:

 

The divergence of an antisymmetric tensor field of type  simplifies to 

The Hessian of a map  is given by

Kulkarni–Nomizu product

The Kulkarni–Nomizu product is an important tool for constructing new tensors from existing tensors on a Riemannian manifold.  Let  and  be symmetric covariant 2-tensors.  In coordinates,

Then we can multiply these in a sense to get a new covariant 4-tensor, which is often denoted .  The defining formula is

Clearly, the product satisfies

In an inertial frame

These coordinates are also called normal coordinates.
In such a frame, the expression for several operators is simpler. Note that the formulae given below are valid at the origin of the frame only.

Conformal change

Then

Evidently, conformality of metrics is an equivalence relation. Here are some formulas for conformal changes in tensors associated with the metric.

Levi-Civita connection

(4,0) Riemann curvature tensor  
  where 
Using the Kulkarni–Nomizu product:

Ricci tensor

Scalar curvature  

 if  this can be written

Traceless Ricci tensor

(3,1) Weyl curvature  
 
  for any vector fields

Volume form

Hodge operator on p-forms

Codifferential on p-forms

Laplacian on functions

Hodge Laplacian on p-forms  
 
The "geometer's" sign convention is used for the Hodge Laplacian here. In particular it has the opposite sign on functions as the usual Laplacian.

Second fundamental form of an immersion  
Recall that the second fundamental form is, for each  a symmetric bilinear map  which is valued in the -orthogonal linear subspace to  Then
  for all 
Here  denotes the -orthogonal projection of  onto the -orthogonal linear subspace to

Mean curvature of an immersion 
In the same setting as above (and suppose  has dimension ), recall that the mean curvature vector is for each  an element  defined as the -trace of the second fundamental form. Then
 
Note that this transformation formula is for the mean curvature vector, and the formula for the mean curvature  in the hypersurface case is
 
where  is a (local) normal vector field.

Variation formulas
Let  be a smooth manifold and let  be a one-parameter family of Riemanannian or pseudo-Riemannian metrics. Suppose that it is a differentiable family in the sense that for any smooth coordinate chart, the derivatives  exist and are themselves as differentiable as necessary for the following expressions to make sense.  is a one-parameter family of symmetric 2-tensor fields.

Principal symbol 
The variation formula computations above define the principal symbol of the mapping which sends a pseudo-Riemannian metric to its Riemann tensor, Ricci tensor, or scalar curvature.
 
 The principal symbol of the map  assigns to each  an endomorphism of the space of symmetric 2-tensors on  given by
 

See also

Liouville equations

Notes

References
 Arthur L. Besse. "Einstein manifolds." Ergebnisse der Mathematik und ihrer Grenzgebiete (3) [Results in Mathematics and Related Areas (3)], 10. Springer-Verlag, Berlin, 1987. xii+510 pp. 

formulas
Riemannian geometry formulas